Lief may refer to:

 Harold Lief (1917–2007), American psychiatrist
 Jacob Lief (fl. 1989–2018), American humanitarian
 Leonard Lief (1924–2007), president of Lehman College

See also
 Lev (disambiguation)
 Leif, a given name